Sid'Ahmed Ould Mohamedou (born 1 January 1966), is a Mauritanian long-distance runner.

Mohamedou competed in two Summer Olympics. At the 1992 Summer Olympics he entered the 5000 metres but he did not finish the race, so did not progress to the final. Four year later at the 1996 Summer Olympics in the 5000 metres he finished 11th in his heat but it still was not good enough to qualify for the next round.

References

1966 births
Living people
Mauritanian male long-distance runners
Olympic athletes of Mauritania
Athletes (track and field) at the 1992 Summer Olympics
Athletes (track and field) at the 1996 Summer Olympics